Spodnja Hajdina is a settlement in the Municipality of Hajdina in northeastern Slovenia. The area is part of the traditional region of Styria. It is now included with the rest of the municipality in the Drava Statistical Region.

Part of the Roman settlement of Poetovio with Mithraic temples and a burial ground has been excavated at an archaeological site near the present-day settlement.

References

External links
Spodnja Hajdina on Geopedia

Populated places in the Municipality of Hajdina